Cape Cornely is a cape on the coast of Victoria Land  north of Cape Day. The cape is marked by a rock exposure and is situated at the south side of the terminus of Mawson Glacier. It was mapped by the United States Geological Survey from surveys and from U.S Navy aerial photographs, 1957–61, and named by the Advisory Committee on Antarctic Names for Joseph R. Cornely, U.S. Navy, radio operator with the wintering parties at Little America V, South Pole Station, and McMurdo Station in three years, 1958, 1961 and 1963.

References 

Headlands of Victoria Land
Scott Coast